Botswana Police XI Sporting Club is a football (soccer) club from Botswana based in village of Otse southern of Gaborone.

Achievements
Botswana Premier League : 1
2006
Botswana FA Cup : 1
1983

Performance in CAF competitions
CAF Champions League: 2 appearances
2006 - Preliminary Round
2007 - Preliminary Round

CAF Cup: 1 appearance
1999 - First Round

External links
Team profile - Soccerway.com

Association football clubs established in 1977
Football clubs in Gaborone
1977 establishments in Botswana
Police association football clubs
Football clubs in Botswana